

See also
List of cities in Pennsylvania
List of municipalities in Pennsylvania
List of census-designated places in Pennsylvania
List of towns and boroughs in Pennsylvania
Pennsylvania metropolitan areas

References

Pennsylvania by population
Cities by population
Pennsylvania